Screamfest '07 was a summer concert tour headlined by American rapper T.I. and R&B singer Ciara.  The tour featured performances from Lloyd, T-Pain, Yung Joc, Tiffany Evans, Yung Berg and 50 Cent.  It was a 20-city tour that took place from August 3, 2007 until September 2, 2007 in the United States. The tour was scheduled to begin July 23, 2007, but it was changed for unknown reasons.

Setlist
Ciara

"Lose Control" 
"Oh"
"Push It"  
"Goodies"
"Promise Ring" (with Tiffany Evans)
"My Love"
"Promise"
"Get Up"
 "1, 2 Step"
"Like You" 
 "Can't Leave 'em Alone"
"Like a Boy"
 "That's Right"

Notes
<small> "Can't Leave 'em Alone" was performed with 50 Cent at the New York City show.

Tour dates

References

Ciara concert tours
2007 concert tours
T.I.